The 60th Infantry Division (60-ya Pekhotnaya Diviziya) was an infantry formation of the Russian Imperial Army.

Organization
1st Brigade
237th Infantry Regiment
238th Infantry Regiment
2nd Brigade
239th Infantry Regiment
240th Infantry Regiment

References

Infantry divisions of the Russian Empire